Älvdalen (Elfdalian: Övdaln or Tjyörtjbynn; literally meaning The River Valley) is a locality and the seat of Älvdalen Municipality in Dalarna County, Sweden, with 1,810 inhabitants in 2010.

The parish is widely known for being the place of manufacturing, in 1839, of the 4-meter granite vase (called Älvdalen Vase), installed in the Summer Garden in Saint Petersburg (a gift from Charles XIV John of Sweden to Nicholas I of Russia).

Nearby is the Hykjebergets Nature Reserve, inaugurated by Prince Carl Philip and Princess Sofia in 2016.

Language

The indigenous language of Älvdalen is Elfdalian. Although it contains many innovations it still preserves various Old Norse traits that have ceased to exist in most other North Germanic languages. The main spoken language in modern times is a Dalecarlian dialect of Swedish, which also is the dominant language in the local administration.

Climate
Älvdalen has a subarctic climate influenced by its location near the furthest interior position on the Scandinavian Peninsula. As a result, seasonal swings are large and the general climate has strong resemblances to Skellefteå much further north at sea level. Being in a river valley, the area is also prone to temperature inversion and harsh freezing.

See also
Scandinavian Mountains Airport

References 

Municipal seats of Dalarna County
Swedish municipal seats
Populated places in Dalarna County
Populated places in Älvdalen Municipality